Slovenia is competing at the 2013 World Aquatics Championships in Barcelona, Spain between 19 July to 4 August 2013.

Swimming

Slovenian swimmers earned qualifying standards in the following events (up to a maximum of 2 swimmers in each event at the A-standard entry time, and 1 at the B-standard):

Men

Women

References

External links
BCN 2013 website
Plavalna Zveza Slovenije 

Nations at the 2013 World Aquatics Championships
2013 in Slovenian sport
Slovenia at the World Aquatics Championships